Arya Vaidya Sala, popularly known as Kottakkal Arya Vaidya Sala, is a healthcare centre located in Kottakkal, in the Indian state of Kerala, known for its heritage and expertise in the Indian traditional medicine system of Ayurveda.

History
Vaidyaratnam P. S. Warrier, a renowned scholar and academician in whose honour the Government of India have issued a postage stamp, founded Arya Vaidya Sala in 1902, at Kottakkal, a small town in Malappuram district, in the Indian state of Kerala, where he hailed from. It began as a small clinic for outpatient treatment and sale of ayurvedic medicines. Fifteen years later, Warrier established the Arya Vaidya Patasala (School of Ayurvedic Medicine), in the town of Kozhikode teaching under the Gurukula method. The school was shifted later to Kottakkal and has transformed itself into a Medical College, Vaidyaratnam P. S. Varier Ayurveda College, affiliated to the University of Calicut. 

Since 1944, when Warrier died, the clinic has been managed by the, Kottakkal Charitable Trust as per the provisions of his Will and testament. Warrier was conferred the title of Vaidyaratnam (jewel among physicians) by the Government of British India in 1933.

After the death 25 December 2014}}</ref> founded Arya Vaidya Sala in 1902, at Kottakkal, a small town in Malappuram district, in the Indian state of Kerala, where he hailed from. It began as a small clinic for outpatient treatment and sale of ayurvedic medicines. Fifteen years later, Warrier established the Arya Vaidya Patasala (School of Ayurvedic Medicine), in the town of Kozhikode teaching under the Gurukula method. The school was shifted later to Kottakkal and has transformed itself into a Medical College, Vaidyaratnam P. S. Varier Ayurveda College, affiliated to the University of Calicut. 

Since 1944, when Warrier died, the clinic has been managed by the, Kottakkal Charitable Trust as per the provisions of his Will and testament. Warrier was conferred the title of Vaidyaratnam (jewel among physicians) by the Government of British India in 1933.of P. S. Warrier, his nephew, P. Madhava Warrier (P. M. Warrier) took over the position as the Chief Physician and became the first Managing Trustee of the charitable trust in 1944. He is reported to have modernized the institution and initiated many efforts for the growth of the institution. Madhava Warrier died in an air crash in 1953 and the next head of the institution was his youngest brother, P. K. Warrier, a renowned physician and the winner of the civilian award, Padma Shri, who is the incumbent Managing Trustee and the Chief Physician.  His duties are shared by P. M. Warrier who is the Chief Superintendent of the institution.

Profile
The Arya Vaidya Sala (AVS) group of institutions has its headquarters in Kottakkal in Malappuram district, located 16 kilometers from Malappuram and 48 kilometers from Kozhikode.  Two of the hospitals run by the group are based at Kottakkal. The group consists of five hospitals of which one is a charitable centre, 15 branches, a research centre, two medicine factories, a Marketing Division overseeing over 1500 retail outlets, and four herbal gardens. The group is reported to be treating over 800,000 patients, through consultation and in patient services. Arya Vaidya Sala is credited with pioneering the concept of readymade ayurvedic medicines and dispensing ayurvedic medicines in the form of pills which are reported to have revolutionized the ayurvedic medicine system.

Hospitals

AVS group manages five hospitals with inpatient facilities with a total capacity of over 400 beds, three under the brand name of Ayurvedic Hospital and Research Centre (AH&RC) one under the name, Charitable Hospital and the fifth - a new Ayurvedic hospital at Baddi, Himachal Pradesh. AH&RC Kottakkal, the flagship hospital, is based in Kottakkal, and has a capacity of 300 beds. Established in 1954, the hospital provides traditional Kerala preparatory therapies along with classical panchakarma treatment. It is known to be a referral hospital and the patient profile is multiethnic. AH&RC Delhi is located at Karkardooma in East Delhi and is a 49 bedded facility. AH&RC Kochi is situated in Thrikkakkara while the Ayurvedic Hospital Baddi is situated at Baddi, Himachal Pradesh, www.aryavaidyasalabaddi.com.

The Charitable Hospital, based in Kottakkal, was started in 1924 and offers free consultation and treatment to the financially compromised. The hospital, which has a capacity of 140 beds, is composed of Panchakarma, Poison treatment and clinical research wards, a surgical unit and a maternity home. The hospital claims that the free treatment provided by the hospital amounts to  900,000 annually. The unit is managed by the Ethical and the Research committees of Arya Vaidya Sala.

Branches
AVS group runs twenty seven branches of which seven are located in Kerala and eight at various other states in India. The branches in Kerala are placed at two locations in Aluva, two places in Kochi, one each at Kannur, Adoor, and Thrikkakkara and a Sales Office in Malappuram whereas the out of state branches are at Delhi, Indore, Ahmedabad, Bengaluru,[Mysuru]  Chennai, Coimbatore, Jamshedpur, Secunderabad and Kolkata.

Centre for Medicinal Plants Research
Arya Vaidya Sala opened its research centre, Centre for Medicinal Plants Research (CMPR) in 2003, with financial assistance from Sir Dorabji Tata Trust. The centre is involved in the research on medicinal plants based on Taxonomy, Tissue culture, Genetic resources, Phytochemistry, Anatomy and Extension activities and is equipped with a phytochemistry laboratory and a tissue culture laboratory. The administration is handled from an administrative office block. The centre is located in Kottakkal and has ongoing research programmes in association with the Council of Scientific and Industrial Research (CSIR) of the Government of India.

Factories
The group has manufacturing facilities at Kottakkal and Kanjikode, near Palakkad. They are operated under license from the Drug Controller's office and has received Good Practices certification from the Government of Kerala. The units support the medicinal requirements of the hospitals run by the group as well as the over the counter sales at the retail outlets. The factories  have in house Quality Assessment departments to oversee the manufacturing processes and are certified by the Bureau of Indian Standards. The total turnover of the manufacturing units is reported to be  19 million.

Herbal gardens
Of the four herbal gardens maintained by the group, two are located at Mannarkkad, near Palakkad and Thrikkakkara, in Ernakulam and together, they measure over 200 acres. AVS has two more demonstration gardens of lesser areas at Kottakkal, making the total area to 220 acres and the gardens provide 44 varieties of herbs to the AVS factories. The gardens permit research and studies to aspiring students which have precipitated several scientific papers and books. The International Development Research Centre (IDRC), Canada has collaborated on one of the projects, Medicinal Plants (India) Project. Some of the notable works that came out of researches are:

 Ayurvedic Drugs and Their Plant Sources
 Some important medicinal plants of the Western Ghats, India: a profile
 Indian Medicinal Plants: A Compendium of 500 Species, Vol. I
 Indian Medicinal Plants: A Compendium of 500 Species, Vol. II
 Indian Medicinal Plants: A Compendium of 500 Species, Vol. III
 Indian Medicinal Plants: A Compendium of 500 Species, Vol. IV
 Indian Medicinal Plants: A Compendium of 500 Species, Vol. V

Marketing
Over 1200 sales outlets have been lined up under the Marketing Division, which has its main office functioning in Kottakkal. The outlets are spread across the country, through franchise system. AVS outlets have also presence in United Arab Emirates, Germany, UK, and USA. These centres also act as a referral point for Arya Vaidya Sala inpatient services in India. It is known that Arya Vaidya Sala does not resort to brand building marketing techniques and keeps its sales and marketing clinic oriented.

See also

 P. K. Warrier
 Vaidyaratnam P. S. Warrier
 Panchakarma
 Documentary on Arya Vaidya Sala in Malayalam - https://www.youtube.com/watch?v=IuPbz-etmMI

References

Further reading

External links
 
 
 
 
 

Ayurveda hospitals
Pharmaceutical companies of India
Hospitals in Kerala
Buildings and structures in Malappuram district
Ayurveda in Kerala
Indian companies established in 1902
1902 establishments in India